The Guardiões do Estado (in English: Guardian of the State), or the acronym GDE, is a Brazilian criminal faction. It operates in the state of Ceará.

It is the 4th largest faction in Brazil and is made up mostly of poorly prepared teenagers, pre-teens and young adults. One of the main reasons would be the lack of monthly fees.

The faction emerged in 2017, in the community of Conjunto Palmeiras.

Faction power is decentralized, so there is no overall faction leader. Currently, it is known for burning buses, massacres and homicides in the state, the most notable being the Massacre of Cajazeiras.

See also 

Primeiro Comando da Capital
Comando Vermelho
Massacre of Cajazeiras(pt)
Attacks in Ceará in 2019(pt)

References 

Terrorism in Brazil
Organized crime groups in Brazil
Prison gangs